The Escarpment Grit is a Triassic geologic formation. It is also referred to as the Nyoka Grit.

Geology
The formation is composed of fluvial sediments, mainly gritstones and coarse sandstones. Uranium is present in the Escarpment Grit of southern Zambia.

Stratigraphy
The Escarpment Grit Formation is the basal unit of the Upper Karoo Group and underlies the Pebbly Arkose Formation. It has been dated as Upper Scythian (Early Triassic).

The Pebbly Arkose has been correlated to the Angwa Sandstone Formation in the Mana Pools and Cabora Bassa Basins, and the Elliot Formation of the Great Karoo Basin, South Africa.

Flora
Alisporites spores have been identified from the Escarpment Grit in north-western Zimbabwe.

Hydrogeology 
This formation constitutes a productive aquifer in north-western Zimbabwe, although of limited thickness.

References 

Geologic formations of Zambia
Geologic formations of Zimbabwe
Triassic System of Africa
Lower Triassic Series
Sandstone formations
Fluvial deposits